Benjamin Bonzi and Antoine Hoang were the defending champions but chose not to defend their title.

Romain Arneodo and Tristan-Samuel Weissborn won the title after defeating Aisam-ul-Haq Qureshi and David Vega Hernández 6–4, 6–2 in the final.

Seeds

Draw

References

External links
 Main draw

Teréga Open Pau–Pyrénées - Doubles